Year 928 (CMXXVIII) was a leap year starting on Tuesday (link will display the full calendar) of the Julian calendar.

Events 
 By place 

 Europe 
 King Rudolph I loses the support of Herbert II, count of Vermandois, who controls the prison at Péronne in which former King Charles III (the Simple) is imprisoned. Herbert brings him before William I (Longsword), count of Rouen, for homage and then to Rheims as leverage to blackmail Rudolph to make him cede sovereignty over Laon (Northern France).
 June 5 – Louis III (the Blind), former king of Provence (Lower Burgundy), dies at Arles after a 27-year reign (of which 23 are sightless). He is succeeded by his brother-in-law Hugh I who is King of Italy. With the approval of his kinsman Rudolph I, Hugh strips Louis's son and heir, Charles Constantine, of his inheritance and proclaims himself as ruler of Provence.
 Winter – King Henry I (the Fowler)  subdues the Polabian Slavs who live on the eastern borders. He then marches against the Slavic Hevelli tribes and seizes their capital, Brandenburg. Henry invades the Glomacze lands in the middle Elbe valley, where he besieges and destroys the main castle called Gana (the later Albrechtsburg) at Meissen (Saxony).

 Britain 
 King Hywel Dda (the Good) of Deheubarth makes a pilgrimage to Rome, he becomes the first Welsh ruler to undertake such a trip. Hywel begins the codification of medieval Welsh law and mints his own coinage.

 Italy 
 Summer – A Fatimid fleet under Sabir al-Fata raids Byzantine southern Italy. It captures a locality named  ('the caves') in Apulia and sacks the cities of Taranto and Otranto. The inhabitants are carried off to North Africa as slaves.

 Asia 
 Ishanavarman II dies after a 5-year reign and is succeeded by his uncle Jayavarman IV as king of the Khmer Empire (modern Cambodia). He moves the capital north from Angkor to Koh Ker.

 By topic 

 Religion 
 Summer – Pope John X is deposed and imprisoned in Castel Sant'Angelo at Rome by order of the Roman senatrix Marozia after a 14-year reign. He is succeeded by Leo VI as the 123rd pope of the Catholic Church.
 Leo VI abolishes the Nin Bishopric and transfers bishop Gregory to Skradin. This ends the long running dispute between the Split and Nin Bishoprics in the Croatian kingdom.
 July 18 – Tryphon succeeds Stephen II as patriarch of Constantinople (until 931).

Births 
 August 14 – Qian Hongzuo, king of Wuyue (d. 947)
 Dub mac Maíl Coluīm, king of Scotland (d. 967)
 Pietro I Orseolo, doge of Venice (d. 987)
 Qian Hongzong, king of Wuyue (d. 971)
 Shi Shouxin, Chinese general (d. 984)

Deaths 
 January 20 – Zhao Guangfeng, Chinese official and chancellor
 June 5 – Louis the Blind, Frankish king and Holy Roman Emperor
 July 18 – Stephen II, patriarch of Constantinople
 November 8 – Duan Ning, Chinese general
 Al-Layth ibn Ali ibn al-Layth, Saffarid emir
 Diogo Fernandes, count of Portugal 
 Huo Yanwei, Chinese general (b. 872)
 Ishanavarman II, king of the Khmer Empire
 John X, pope of the Catholic Church
 Siyahchashm, Justanid ruler (mahdi) 
 Tomislav, duke and king of Croatia
 Wang, empress dowager of Wu
 Yusuf ibn Abi'l-Saj, Sajid emir
 Zhang Juhan, Chinese official (b. 858)

References